Wimmer is a German surname. Notable people with the surname include:

Boniface Wimmer (1809–1887), German monk who founded the first Benedictine monastery in the United States
Carl Wimmer (born 1975), former member of the Utah House of Representatives
Chris Wimmer (born 1979), American driver
Christian Friedrich Heinrich Wimmer (1803–1868), German botanist who was a native of Breslau
Dick Wimmer (1936–2011), American novelist
Eckard Wimmer (born 1936), American scientist and a Distinguished Professor of Stony Brook University
Friedrich Wimmer (soldier) (1912–1986), highly decorated Oberfeldwebel in the Wehrmacht during World War II
Gerd Wimmer (born 1977), retired Austrian football player
Helmut Wimmer, painter and staff artist for New York's Hayden Planetarium from 1954 to 1987
Herbert Wimmer (born 1944), former football player
Joseph Wimmer (born 1934), member of the Wisconsin State Assembly
Julie Wimmer (born 1975), designer in the field of jewelry and glass
Kevin Wimmer (born 1992), Austrian footballer
Kurt Wimmer (born 1964), American screenwriter and film director
Larry T. Wimmer (born 1935), the Warren and Wilson Dusenberry University Professor at Brigham Young University
Manfred Wimmer (1944–1995), the first Western professional Go player
Martin Wimmer (born 1957), former Grand Prix motorcycle road racer from Germany
Natasha Wimmer (born 1973), American translator
Per Wimmer (born 1968), Danish space advocate and a future space traveller
Scott Wimmer (born 1976), NASCAR Nationwide Series driver who was born in Wausau, Wisconsin
Willy Wimmer (born 1943), German politician

See also
Wimmer's shrew (Crocidura wimmeri) is a white-toothed shrew found only in Côte d'Ivoire

German-language surnames